Robert Kemp (1908–1967) was a Scottish playwright.  Along with Tom Fleming and Lennox Milne, he was a founder of the Edinburgh Gateway Company (1953 - 1965).

He was born at Longhope in Orkney, where his father was the minister. Educated at Robert Gordon's College and the University of Aberdeen, he lived in London and then in Edinburgh (in Warriston Crescent). Before turning to drama, he trained as a journalist with the Manchester Guardian. From the time he adapted Molière's L'Ecole des Femmes for the Scottish stage in 1947 he sought to promote a distinctly national drama, often employing Scots dialogue.  In 1948, working with Tyrone Guthrie, he staged a revival of Scotland's first Scottish play, David Lyndsay's Ane Pleasant Satyre of the Thrie Estaitis and, also in 1948, he coined the phrase “Edinburgh Festival Fringe”. His son, Arnold Kemp, achieved fame as a newspaper editor.

Published work
Robert Kemp's plays include:

 Let Wives Tak Tent (1948): a free translation into Scots of Molière's L'école des femmes inspired by the Compagnie Jouvet of Paris's production of the play at the first Edinburgh International Festival in 1947
 The Heart is Highland (1954)
 The Laird o' Grippy (1954): a free translation into Scots of Molière's L'avare (The Miser)
 Off A Duck's Back (1961)
 The Other Dear Charmer 
 The Perfect Gent (1962)
 The Asset (play)
 Master John Knox (play) St. Andrew Press, 1960

Other plays
 When the Star Fell (1946), a nativity play staged for Christmas at the Church of Scotland's Gateway Theatre at 41 Elm Row, Edinburgh
 The Scientific Singers / A Nest of Singing Birds (1955 / 1957)
 Conspirators (1955)
 Marigold (1955), a musical play, with music by Cedric Thorpe Davie
 The Man Among the Roses (1956), a verse play based on the ballad of Tam Lin
 The Penny Wedding (1957)
 The Daft Days (1957), adapted from the novel by Neil Munro
 Rob Roy (1960), adapted from the novel by Sir Walter Scott

Further reading
 Mackie, A.D., Kemp, Robert, Milne, Lennox, Fleming, Tom & Kelsall, Moultrie R. (1965), The Twelve Seasons of the Edinburgh Gateway Company, 1953 - 1965, St. Giles Press, Edinburgh
 Findlay, Bill, "The Founding of a Modern Tradition: Robert Kemp's Scots translations of Molière at the Gateway", in Brown, Ian (ed.) (2004), Journey's Beginning: The Gateway Theatre Building and Company, 1884 - 1965, Intellect Ltd., Bristol,

References

External links
 Special Collection of Robert Kemp's work held by Glasgow University Library.

1908 births
1967 deaths
People educated at Robert Gordon's College
Alumni of the University of Aberdeen
Scottish dramatists and playwrights
Writers from Orkney
20th-century British dramatists and playwrights
Edinburgh Festival Fringe